Bischofia javanica, or bishop wood, is a plant species of the family Phyllanthaceae. It and the related Bischofia polycarpa are the only two members of genus Bischofia and tribe Bischofieae. These species are distributed throughout southern and southeast Asia to Australia and Polynesia also in North America (brought to North America as a decorative plant but now considered to be an invasive species). The tree is commonly used by tigers to scratch-mark territory in the jungles of Assam where it is locally called uriam. They also occur in southwestern, central, eastern, and southern China, and also Taiwan, where the indigenous people consider it a sacred tree.

Uses
 The dark red, dense wood is used as a building material for items ranging from furniture to bridges; it is durable but is difficult to air-dry. It is also ideal as firewood.
 The fruits are used in making wine.
 The seeds, which are edible, contain 30-54% oil, which is used as a lubricant.
 The bark has a high tannin content and is used as a source of red dye to stain rattan baskets and colour tapa cloth.
 The roots are used medicinally.
 The leaves are eaten in Southern Laos dipped into chili sauce.

References

Phyllanthaceae
Flora of Asia
Flora of Papuasia
Flora of Queensland
Plants described in 1827